Bourjein - Marjiyat  is a populated area in the Chouf District of Lebanon. The area is approximately 300 meters high and has a school with about 80 students which closed at the time of Lebanese civil war.

References

Populated places in Chouf District